Deniss Romanovs (born 2 September 1978) is a retired Latvian football goalkeeper.

Club career

His early career was spent with Latvian sides Skonto-Metāls, Valmiera, Ventspils and Ditton.

During the 2008/09 season he joined Slavia Praha.

In July 2010 Romanovs moved to Azerbaijan, signing a two-year deal with Khazar Lankaran.

In January 2011 he joined Indonesian club Cendrawasih. After the first round of the championship due to some internal problems the championship was stopped, the foreigners' limit was changed and Cendrawasih ended its existence.

Before the start of the 2013 season Romanovs joined Indonesian Premier League newcomers Pro Duta. On 24 October 2013 he scored a goal from the penalty spot in a 6-0 league victory over Bontang. On 28 November 2013, Romanovs signed with Pelita Bandung Raya.

International career
Romanovs made his debut for Latvia in a friendly match against Bahrain in 2004.

References

External links
 
 
 

1978 births
Living people
Footballers from Riga
Latvian footballers
Latvian people of Russian descent
Skonto FC players
FK Ventspils players
Latvia international footballers
Association football goalkeepers
Latvian expatriate footballers
FC Dinamo București players
Liga I players
Expatriate footballers in Romania
Latvian expatriate sportspeople in Romania
SK Slavia Prague players
Czech First League players
Expatriate footballers in the Czech Republic
Khazar Lankaran FK players
Expatriate footballers in Azerbaijan
Latvian expatriate sportspeople in Azerbaijan
Expatriate footballers in Indonesia
Arema F.C. players
Pro Duta FC players
Pelita Bandung Raya players
Liga 1 (Indonesia) players
Indonesian Premier League players
Latvian expatriate sportspeople in Indonesia
Latvian expatriate sportspeople in the Czech Republic
FK RFS players